The 1925 Oberlin Yeomen football team was an American football team that represented Oberlin College in the Ohio Athletic Conference (OAC) during the 1925 college football season.  In its first season under head coach Paul N. MacEachron, the team compiled a 7–0–1 record (5–0–1 against OAC opponents), finished in second place in the OAC, shut out five of eight opponents, and outscored all opponents by a total of 92 to 19.

In the season's first game, Oberlin dedicated its new athletic stadium. At that time, the first four sections were opened with seating for 3,000 persons.

Schedule

References

Oberlin
Oberlin Yeomen football seasons
College football undefeated seasons
Oberlin Yeomen football